The Construction Project Information Committee is an advisory group, comprising representatives of major UK construction industry institutions, which provides best practice guidance on the content, form and preparation of construction production information, and disseminates this throughout the industry.

History
CPIC started as the Building Project Information Committee (BPIC) established in February 1987 by the RIBA, RICS, ACE, CIBSE and ICE. BPIC succeeded the Co-ordinating Committee for Project Information (CCPI) which had been established to provide guidance on efficient preparation of project specifications and production drawings.

Research has shown that many problems on site are caused by poor or missing production information. The evidence shows that improvements in the quality of production reduce the incidence of site quality problems and lead to significant savings in the cost of construction work. Modern CAD systems can contribute greatly to the quality and clarity of drawn production information and, if used in a collaborative way by the whole design team, will result in benefit for all the concerned: clients, designers and constructors. The Avanti approach had showed that the use of CPIC materials would improve the quality and reduce the costs of construction projects.

In recent years, CPIC has been a key player in the development of common industry approaches to building information modelling (BIM).

Code of Procedure for the Construction Industry
Effective communication of high quality production information between designers and constructors is essential for the satisfactory realisation of construction projects. This is addressed by the CPIC code of procedure, the essential reference on production information, which sets out principles and procedures based on the use of computers and offers a pragmatic approach in providing guidance to users of widely used 2D CAD systems. The guidance on specification is also based on the use of the dominant computer systems.

In a move that reinforces the close relationship between the drawings and specification, the code combines the original drawing and specification documents into a single guide. This has been extended to cover use of CAD and to take into account the use of schedules of work. It provides pragmatic guidance on use of drawings, specifications and schedules of work and the methods used to co-ordinate the information contained within. Key themes that appear in the code are standardisation, information re-use and information management.

The starting point for the guidance in the code is the creation of standards. From project inception, all parties should agree the methods and protocols of exchanging information. This includes not just CAD and specification, but also spreadsheets and word processing documents. Standardisation removes any barriers to exchange and improves the communication process.
BS 1192 relies heavily on the guidance in this code.

Uniclass
Uniclass is a classification scheme for the construction industry, the full name of which is "Unified Classification for the Construction Industry". It is intended for organising library materials and for structuring product literature and project information. It incorporates Common Arrangement of Work Sections (CAWS) and Electronic Product Information Co-operation (EPIC), a new system for structuring product data and product literature.

Uniclass comprises 15 tables, each of which represents a different broad facet of construction information. Each table can be used as a "stand alone" table for the classification of a particular type of information, but, in addition, terms from different tables can be combined to classify complex subjects.

Common Arrangement of Work Sections (CAWS)
CAWS defines an efficient and generally acceptable arrangement for specifications and bills of quantities for building projects. It consists of a set of detailed work section definitions, all within a classification framework of Groups and Sub-groups. The CAWS classification down to the level of work section titles forms one of the 15 tables of the Uniclass classification scheme.

Different titles often mean different things in different industry documents and to different groups of people. CAWS provides the detailed definitions in order to reduce needless variations and conflicts between documents and even within the same document. In practice this means concentrating on the boundaries to ensure that gaps and overlaps between sections are eliminated.

CAWS includes about 360 work sections. They are derived from close observation of current practice, following the pattern of sub-contracting in the industry.

CPIC members
Royal Institute of British Architects (RIBA)
Chartered Institute of Architectural Technologists (CIAT)
Chartered Institution of Building Services Engineers (CIBSE)
Royal Institution of Chartered Surveyors (RICS)
Institution of Civil Engineers (ICE)
UK Contractors Group (UKCG)

Current documents published by CPIC
 Production information: a code of procedure for the construction industry
 Uniclass: unified classification for the construction industry
 Common Arrangement of Work Sections for Building Works

References

External links
 CPIC
 CAWS

Civil engineering organizations
Construction industry of the United Kingdom
Architecture organisations based in the United Kingdom